The 1990 NCAA Division II Men's Soccer Championship was the 19th annual tournament held by the NCAA to determine the top men's Division II college soccer program in the United States.

Southern Connecticut State defeated Seattle Pacific in the final, winning in a penalty kick shootout after the championship match finished 0–0 through four overtime periods. This was the Owls' (22-0-1) second national title and first for coach Ray Reid.

The final match was held in Melbourne, Florida on December 1, 1990.

Bracket

Final

See also  
 NCAA Division I Men's Soccer Championship
 NCAA Division III Men's Soccer Championship
 NAIA Men's Soccer Championship

References 

NCAA Division II Men's Soccer Championship
NCAA Division II Men's Soccer Championship
NCAA Division II Men's Soccer Championship
NCAA Division II Men's Soccer Championship